Toby MacFarlaine (born 28 November 1975) is an English musician.

References

Living people
English heavy metal guitarists
English heavy metal bass guitarists
English male guitarists
People from Oxford
1975 births
21st-century British guitarists
21st-century British male musicians
People educated at Varndean College